The Absolute Infinite (symbol: Ω) is an extension of the idea of infinity proposed by mathematician Georg Cantor.

It can be thought of as a number that is bigger than any other conceivable or inconceivable quantity, either finite or transfinite.

Cantor linked the Absolute Infinite with God, and believed that it had various mathematical properties, including the reflection principle: every property of the Absolute Infinite is also held by some smaller object.

Cantor's view 
Cantor said:

Cantor also mentioned the idea in his letters to Richard Dedekind (text in square brackets not present in original):

The Burali-Forti paradox 

The idea that the collection of all ordinal numbers cannot logically exist seems paradoxical to many. This is related to Cesare Burali-Forti's "paradox" which states that there can be no greatest ordinal number. All of these problems can be traced back to the idea that, for every property that can be logically defined, there exists a set of all objects that have that property. However, as in Cantor's argument (above), this idea leads to difficulties.

More generally, as noted by A. W. Moore, there can be no end to the process of set formation, and thus no such thing as the totality of all sets, or the set hierarchy.  Any such totality would itself have to be a set, thus lying somewhere within the hierarchy and thus failing to contain every set.

A standard solution to this problem is found in Zermelo's set theory, which does not allow the unrestricted formation of sets from arbitrary properties. Rather, we may form the set of all objects that have a given property and lie in some given set (Zermelo's Axiom of Separation). This allows for the formation of sets based on properties, in a limited sense, while (hopefully) preserving the consistency of the theory.

While this solves the logical problem, one could argue that the philosophical problem remains. It seems natural that a set of individuals ought to exist, so long as the individuals exist. Indeed, naive set theory might be said to be based on this notion. Although Zermelo's fix allows a class to describe arbitrary (possibly "large") entities, these predicates of the meta-language may have no formal existence (i.e., as a set) within the theory. For example, the class of all sets would be a proper class. This is philosophically unsatisfying to some and has motivated additional work in set theory and other methods of formalizing the foundations of mathematics such as New Foundations by Willard Van Orman Quine.

See also 
 Actual infinity
 Limitation of size
 Monadology
 Reflection principle
 The Ultimate (philosophy)
 Ineffability

Notes

Bibliography 
 The role of the absolute infinite in Cantor's conception of set
 Infinity and the Mind, Rudy Rucker, Princeton, New Jersey: Princeton University Press, 1995, ; orig. pub. Boston: Birkhäuser, 1982, .
 The Infinite, A. W. Moore, London, New York: Routledge, 1990, .
 Set Theory, Skolem's Paradox and the Tractatus, A. W. Moore, Analysis 45, #1 (January 1985), pp. 13–20.

Philosophy of mathematics
Infinity
Superlatives in religion
Conceptions of God